Arthur Bostrom FRGS (born 6 January 1955) is an English actor, best known for his role as Officer Crabtree in the long-running BBC TV sitcom 'Allo 'Allo!.

Biography

Early life
Bostrom was born in Rugby, Warwickshire and attended Lawrence Sheriff School, where he was a contemporary with Kevin Warwick. He graduated from St Chad's College, University of Durham. In 1977 he performed at the Edinburgh Festival as part of Durham University Sensible Thespians (DUST). Besides his television career, he acted on the stage regularly, also being a trained life coach. He lived in Manchester for a long time.

Professional career
Bostrom had a small role in Miss Marple series 1 The Body in the Library in 1984.
Bostrom had a recurrent character in 'Allo 'Allo!, first appearing midway through the second series and remaining until the show's finale. Officer Crabtree was played as an hopeless British undercover officer, disguised constantly as a French local policeman during the Second World War. Much of the character's humour derived from his supposed inability to pronounce French words correctly in conversation, which, on an English-language television programme, was represented by ludicrous exaggeration and mispronunciation of ordinary English words. For example, "Good morning" would be pronounced as "Good moaning", "I was just passing round the corner" would be "I was just pissing roond the corner", and famously, "The bombers were being chased by fighters when they dropped their bombs on the London docks" became "The bummers were being chased by farters when they drooped their bums on the London dicks'. Bostrom actually speaks fluent French. Prior to this he appeared in Stephen Fry & Hugh Laurie's  1983 sketch show pilot 'The Crystal Cube' which was not commissioned for a series. 
 
In 2005, Bostrom guest-starred in Dead Man Walking, an audio drama based on the television series Sapphire and Steel. From December 2007 to January 2008, he continued his pantomime run when he appeared in a production as an ugly sister in Cinderella in Middlesbrough. On 8 January 2008, he appeared in an episode of Big Brother's Big Mouth on E4. He discussed events in the house after introducing the show in the familiar character of Officer Crabtree.

On 3 March 2010 he appeared as a vicar in the BBC One daytime soap opera doctors and again in doctors (17:163) on 25 January 2016 as sommelier Murray Bathurst.

Bostrom appeared (alongside fellow  'Allo 'Allo! alumnus Sam Kelly) in the BBC radio dramatisation of The Good Soldier Švejk by Jaroslav Hašek in November 2008, playing the part of Wendler.

In November 2012, Bostrom appeared in Hebburn as a newspaper editor.

In 2017, he appeared in the BBC series Father Brown as Richie Queenan in episode 5.12 "The Theatre of the Invisible"

In 2017 he appeared on a celebrity edition of Pointless.

In October 2018 he reprised his role from 'Allo 'Allo! in the book Good Moaning France: Officer Crabtree's Fronch Phrose Berk, in which he attempts to teach others to 'spook the Fronch longwodge'.

References

External links
Official website

1955 births
Living people
People from Rugby, Warwickshire
People educated at Lawrence Sheriff School
Alumni of St Chad's College, Durham
English male stage actors
English male television actors
Life coaches
Fellows of the Royal Geographical Society
20th-century English male actors
21st-century English male actors
Pantomime dames
British male comedy actors